The Arab Reform Initiative,  is a leading independent think-tank consisting of a network of independent Arab research and policy institutes, with partners from the Middle East, the Maghreb, Europe, South America, and the United States. It was founded in 2005; the executive director is Nadim Houry.

Members

In Arab countries
Al-Ahram Center for Political and Strategic Studies, Egypt
Arab Forum for Alternatives, Egypt
Arab Reform Forum at the Bibliotheca Alexandrina, Egypt
Egyptian Center for Public Opinion Research - Baseera, Egypt
The Center for Strategic Studies, Jordan
Lebanese Center for Policy Studies, Lebanon
Center D’Etudes et de Recherches en Sciences Sociales (CERSS), Morocco
Palestinian Center for Political and Survey Research, Palestine
King Faisal Center for Research and Islamic Studies, Saudi Arabia
Center for Sudanese Studies, Sudan
EtanaCenter, Syria
Syrian League for Citizenship, Syria
L'Observatoire Tunisien de la Transition Démocratique, Tunisia
Gulf Research Center, United Arab Emirates
Yemeni Observatory for Human Rights, Yemen

In Europe
European Institute for Security Studies, France
Hellenic Foundation for European and Foreign Policy (ELIAMEP), Greece
Casa Árabe, Spain
Center for European Reform, United Kingdom

In the Americas
Universidad Nacional de Tres de Febrero, Argentina
US Middle East Project, United States.

Projects 

 The Supporting Arab Women at the Table (SAWT) Project
 The Arab Hub for Social Protection against COVID-19

References

External links
Official Website

Political and economic think tanks based in Asia
Think tanks established in 2005